Khudi Khola Hydropower Station (Nepali: खुदी खोला जलविद्युत आयोजना) is a run-of-river hydro-electric plant located in Simpani, Lamjung District of Nepal. The flow from Khudi River, a tributary of Marshyangdi River, is used to generate 4 MW electricity. The plant started generating electricity from 2063-09-15 BS. The generation licence will expire in 2096-11-12 BS, after which the plant will be handed over to the government. The power station is connected to the national grid and the electricity is sold to Nepal Electricity Authority. 

Butwal Power Company has 60% stake in Khudi Hydropower Ltd. and other investors are SCP Hydro International inc. (SCPHI) and Lamjung Electricity Development Company Limited (LEDCO) with 25 % and 15 % stake respectively.

See also
List of power stations in Nepal

References

Hydroelectric power stations in Nepal
Gravity dams
Run-of-the-river power stations
Dams in Nepal
Irrigation in Nepal
2006 establishments in Nepal
Buildings and structures in Lamjung District